Rijan (also Romanized as Rījān; also known as Reyḩān) is a village in Jushaq Rural District, in the Central District of Delijan County, Markazi Province, Iran. At the 2006 census, its population was 161, in 50 families.

References 

Populated places in Delijan County